The New Backwards is an album by Coil released on 18 April 2008. The album is reworked from the Backwards demo, which was originally created for Nothing Records.

Background
The New Backwards was produced by Peter Christopherson and Danny Hyde, and is reworked from the Backwards demo, which was submitted to Torso Records in 1993 and then further recorded at Trent Reznor's Nothing Studios in New Orleans, Louisiana, in the mid-1990s for a planned release on Reznor's Nothing Records imprint on major label Interscope Records. The record was made in Bangkok in 2007.

The album was originally released on 12" vinyl as part of a box set reissue of the album The Ape of Naples. It is currently available on 12" vinyl, compact disc, and downloads in FLAC, aac, and mp3 formats.

On , the album was re-released in an 'Expanded Edition' through Infinite Fog Productions, which added previously unreleased and unfinished material from the album's recording sessions.

Track listing

CD & Digital

12" vinyl
This is the fourth LP in the four-record The Ape of Naples box set.

Extended Edition bonus tracks

Backwards demo

Backwards was a studio bootleg recording by Coil. The origin of the source of "Backwards" is believed to have been a leak of the studio demo, in the form of a cassette.  However, the entire demo was broadcast when Dutch radio station Radio 4, had Coil as in-studio guests to coincide with a live performance on 1 June 2001. The program was broadcast on 18 June 2001 and a four-disc CD-R set of the entire broadcast was released in an unknown quantity as Dutch Radio4 Supplement. Although part of the proposed album was eventually released as The Ape of Naples, the material is so augmented that there are very few recognizable samples.

The proposed release on Nothing Records was continuously put off. The Ape of Naples is considered to be the reincarnation of a demo, as it featured completely reworked versions of "Heaven's Blade", "AYOR" and other songs that are believed to have been originally created around the time of Backwards.

"Bee Has Photos" and "Egyptian Basses" are not considered to be officially part of this bootleg as they were released as part of the Songs of the Week download series and not on the supposed original demo. However, the version from Songs of the Week is an alternate version, much shorter in length.

On the live Coil album Live Three, a song called "Backwards" is performed. This song is an incarnation of the songs "Simenon" and "Bee Has Photos".

This bootleg comprises the material for an album with several proposed titles, such as International Dark Skies, God Please Fuck My Mind for Good, Fire of the Mind, The World Ended a Long Time Ago and Backwards. Other proposed titles are also possibly referenced by this material.

Track listing

Three extra tracks, "Bee Has the Photos", "Egyptian Basses" and a different version of "Spastiche", have been circulated with the demos.

References

External links
 
 
 The New Backwards at Brainwashed

2008 albums
Coil (band) albums
Albums published posthumously
Threshold House albums